The Liga Mayor de Fútbol de Lima, the second division of Peruvian football (soccer) from 1975 until 1984. Later it played the role between a third to fourth category, below the intermediate and second division.

Champions

References

External links
EGB en la Liga Mayor Fútbol Lima 80's
Lau Chun en la Liga Mayor
Defensor Kiwi en la Liga Mayor 1987
Liga Mayor de Fútbol de Lima 1987
Defensor Lima en la Liga Mayor
Un poco de historia
Más datos de la Liga Mayor de Fútbol de Lima  
Experiencia de Diego Rebagliati en la Liga Mayor, Video minuto 8:07

2
Peru
Defunct sports competitions in Peru